Peel Road Railway Station (Manx: Stashoon Raad Yiarn Raad Purt ny h-Inshey) was a station on the Manx Northern Railway, later owned and operated by the Isle of Man Railway. It served the area known as Poortown in the Isle of Man and was an intermediate stopping place on a line that ran between St. John's and Ramsey.

Origins
It was the closest station on the Manx Northern Railway to the city and prior to its establishment the company considered either a spur or terminus station there, ultimately selecting a route to St. John's which connected with the Peel Line of the Isle of Man Railway Company. The station was a request stop and appeared erratically on the company's timetable literature throughout its early years.

Buildings
The facilities here consisted of a simple wooden station building with corrugated iron roof which sat next to short raised platform. This was later accompanied by a grounded van body which was used as a permanent way store. The station was renamed Peel Road in 1885 to reflect the fact that it was the railway's station closest to Peel, although it is also thought that the original title was derisory to the local inhabitants and the railway had received a number of requests to re-title the station. At one time there was a sharply curving siding off the running line which facilitated the collection of stone from the nearby quarry, but the opening and closure dates are unknown.

Closure
Trains did however still stop at the station upon request. Despite remaining open until this time, it became an unstaffed halt as early as 1937. It was still in evidence during the final season of operation in 1968 but its remote location in comparison to the locale from which it took its name ensured that it was very little used in later years.

Today
Other than the vague outline of the old platform in the undergrowth and the bridge that carries the Poortown Road over the railway line at its northern end, there is little to remind us of the station here today. The buildings which were derelict when the railway closed in 1968 were demolished in 1975 at the same time as the rails were lifted. It forms part of a public footpath and may still be accessed by a sloping driveway above.

Route

See also
 Isle of Man Railway stations

References

Sources
 [Isle of Man Steam Railway Supporters' Association]

Railway stations in the Isle of Man
Railway stations opened in 1883
Railway stations closed in 1951
Peel, Isle of Man